The canton of Joux-la-Ville is an administrative division of the Yonne department, central France. It was created at the French canton reorganisation which came into effect in March 2015. Its seat is in Joux-la-Ville.

It consists of the following communes:
 
Arcy-sur-Cure
Asnières-sous-Bois
Asquins
Bazarnes
Bessy-sur-Cure
Blannay
Bois-d'Arcy
Brosses
Chamoux
Châtel-Censoir
Coulanges-sur-Yonne
Coutarnoux
Crain
Deux Rivières
Dissangis
Domecy-sur-Cure
Festigny
Foissy-lès-Vézelay
Fontenay-près-Vézelay
Fontenay-sous-Fouronnes
Givry
Joux-la-Ville
Lichères-sur-Yonne
Lucy-sur-Cure
Lucy-sur-Yonne
Mailly-la-Ville
Mailly-le-Château
Merry-sur-Yonne
Montillot
Pierre-Perthuis
Précy-le-Sec
Prégilbert
Sainte-Colombe
Sainte-Pallaye
Saint-Moré
Saint-Père
Sery
Tharoiseau
Trucy-sur-Yonne
Vermenton
Vézelay
Voutenay-sur-Cure

References

Cantons of Yonne